The Cedar Creek Grist Mill is a historical grist mill located in Woodland, Washington listed on the National Register of Historic Places. The mill was built in 1876 by George W. Woodham family and A.C. Reid.  The remains of the dam which supplied water to the mill were removed in 1950s. The mill was restored to working condition in the 1980s and now operates as a museum.

References

External links
 Cedar Creek Grist Mill - official site, the only one affiliated with the Mill and run by volunteers.

1876 establishments in Washington Territory
Buildings and structures in Clark County, Washington
Grinding mills in Washington (state)
Grinding mills on the National Register of Historic Places in Washington (state)
Industrial buildings completed in 1876
Mill museums in the United States
Museums in Clark County, Washington
National Register of Historic Places in Clark County, Washington